Amarajeevi is a 1983 Telugu-language romance film, produced by Bhimavarapu Bhuchchi Reddy under the Jyothi Art Creations banner and directed by Jandhyala. The film stars Akkineni Nageswara Rao, Jaya Pradha and music composed by Chakravarthy.

Plot
Dr. Murali (Akkineni Nageswara Rao) a well-renowned eye-specialist who shows hatred towards women as he is victimized by a girl Savitri (Sumalatha). At present, all of a sudden, a young lady Lalitha (Jaya Prada) enters in his life and he deeply falls for her. Thereafter, to his dismal Lalitha presents her wedding card saying that she going to marry a wise person Madhu (Sarath Babu) and affirms herself as the elder sister of Savitri who has made the play for deceiving her sister. At that point in time, Murali rescues his old classmate Shekar's (Narasimha Raju) son from losing eyesight when he rues and reveals the truth. In fact, Murali & Savitri are sincere lovers, it begrudged Shekar as he aspires to possess her. So, he created a rift between them which led to Savitri's death. Right now, Shekar proclaims his sin before Lalitha too when she decides to stop the marriage. But here the wheel of fortune makes Madhu as a close friend to Murali, so he convinces Lalitha and couples them. Soon after, Madhu spots the intimacy of Murali & Lalitha and suspects which leads to turmoil in their marital life. During the plight, frustrated Madhu loses his eyesight in an accident when Murali donates his eyes to being extant that aggravates Madhu's suspicion and necks out Lalitha. Mentally disturbed Latitha reaches Murali when he pleads before Madhu but he is not ready to listen. After that, he learns the reality from Shekar, repents and immediately rushes. By the time, Murali consumes poison when Madhu requests a pardon from him and accepts Lalitha. Finally, the movie ends Murali breathes his last in the lap of Lalitha.

Cast
Akkineni Nageswara Rao as Dr. Murali
Jaya Prada as Lalitha
Sarath Babu as Madhu
Narasimha Raju as Shekar
Kanta Rao 
Nagesh as Babu
Sakshi Ranga Rao 
Suthi Velu
Kota Srinivasa Rao
Pandari Bai
Sumalatha as Savitri 
Sri Lakshmi

Soundtrack

Music was composed by Chakravarthy. Lyrics were written by Veturi. Music was released on Audio Company.

Others
 VCDs and DVDs on - SANTOSH Videos, Hyderabad

References

External links

Films directed by Jandhyala
Indian romance films
Films scored by K. Chakravarthy
1980s romance films
1980s Telugu-language films